Euschmidtiidae is a family of grasshoppers in the order Orthoptera. There are at least 60 genera and more than 240 described species in Euschmidtiidae, found in Sub-Saharan Africa and surrounding islands.

Genera
These 60 genera belong to the family Euschmidtiidae:

 Acanthomastax Descamps, 1964
 Acridomastax Descamps, 1971
 Amalomastax Rehn & Rehn, 1945
 Amatonga Rehn & Rehn, 1945
 Ambatomastax Descamps & Wintrebert, 1965
 Apteropeoedes Bolívar, 1903
 Apteroschmidtia Descamps, 1973
 Caenoschmidtia Descamps, 1973
 Carcinomastax Rehn & Rehn, 1945
 Chromomastax Descamps, 1964
 Cryptomastax Descamps, 1971
 Dactulomastax Descamps, 1971
 Dendromastax Descamps & Wintrebert, 1965
 Descampsiella Özdikmen, 2008
 Dichromastax Descamps, 1971
 Elutronuxia Descamps, 1964
 Eudirshia Roy, 1961
 Euschmidtia Karsch, 1889
 Exophtalmomastax Descamps, 1964
 Harpemastax Descamps, 1964
 Isalomastax Descamps & Wintrebert, 1965
 Kratopodia Descamps, 1964
 Kwalea Descamps, 1973
 Lavanonia Descamps, 1964
 Lobomastax Descamps, 1964
 Loboschmidtia Descamps, 1973
 Macromastax Karsch, 1889
 Malagamastax Descamps, 1964
 Maroantsetraia Descamps, 1964
 Mastachopardia Descamps, 1964
 Mastaleptea Descamps, 1971
 Microlobia Descamps, 1964
 Micromastax Descamps, 1964
 Microschmidtia Descamps, 1973
 Namontia Descamps, 1964
 Paraschmidtia Descamps, 1964
 Parasymbellia Descamps, 1964
 Parawintrebertia Descamps & Wintrebert, 1965
 Pauromastax Descamps, 1974
 Penichrotes Karsch, 1889
 Peoedes Karsch, 1889
 Platymastax Descamps, 1964
 Pseudamatonga Descamps, 1971
 Pseudoschmidtia Rehn & Rehn, 1945
 Raphimastax Descamps, 1971
 Rhinomastax Descamps, 1971
 Sauromastax Descamps, 1964
 Scleromastax Descamps, 1971
 Sphaerophallus Descamps, 1964
 Symbellia Burr, 1899
 Tapiamastax Descamps & Wintrebert, 1965
 Teratomastax Descamps, 1964
 Tetefortina Descamps, 1964
 Trichoschmidtia Descamps, 1974
 Wintrebertella Descamps, 1964
 Wintrebertia Descamps, 1964
 Wintrebertina Descamps, 1971
 Xenomastax Descamps, 1964
 Xenoschmidtia Descamps, 1973
 † Stenoschmidtia Descamps, 1973

References

Further reading

 
 

 
Caelifera